Leonhard may refer to:
Leonhard Euler (1707–1783), Swiss mathematician and physicist 
Leonhard Hutter (1563–1616), German theologian 
Karl Leonhard (1904–1988), German psychiatrist
Jim Leonhard (1982– ), American football safety
LEONHARD (2009– ), Oslo-based DJ collective
Leonhard Rauwolf (1535–1596), German physician and botanist
Leonhard Stejneger (1851–1943), American herpetologist
Wolfgang Leonhard (1921-2014), German author & historian